Benjamin Weß (also spelled Wess; born 28 July 1985 in Moers) is a field hockey player from Germany and the younger brother of Timo Weß. He was a member of the Men's National Team that won the gold medal at the 2008 Summer Olympics and the 2012 Summer Olympics.

References

External links

 
 
 
 
 

1985 births
Living people
German male field hockey players
Olympic field hockey players of Germany
Field hockey players at the 2008 Summer Olympics
Olympic gold medalists for Germany
Olympic medalists in field hockey
Field hockey players at the 2012 Summer Olympics
Medalists at the 2012 Summer Olympics
Medalists at the 2008 Summer Olympics
People from Moers
Sportspeople from Düsseldorf (region)
2010 Men's Hockey World Cup players
2014 Men's Hockey World Cup players
21st-century German people